Zhang Shenfu (1893–1986), born Zhang Songnian (张崧年), courtesy name Shenfu (申甫), was a founder of the Chinese Communist Party, a philosopher, and a political activist. Zhang was born on June 15, 1893, in Xiaoduo village, Zhili (modern Hebei). His father, Zhang Liangong, was a senior official. In 1912, Zhang enrolled at Middle School Affiliated to Senior Normal School (高等师范学堂附属中学班) in Beiping (today Beijing). He later enrolled at Peking University to study philosophy and math in 1914. After graduating, Zhang started to lecture at Peking University, as well as assisting the work of university librarian Li Dazhao. When the Chinese Communist Party was founded by Chen Duxiu and Li Dazhao in the French concession of Shanghai in 1921 as a study society and informal network, Zhang organized the counterpart group in France (latter used to engage in Lyon Sino-French University after WWI) and then introduced his fiancée Liu Qingyang and friend Zhou Enlai to CCP. In 1925, due to disagreements with other representatives at the fourth congress, Zhang quit the party. After CCP won the Chinese Civil War, Zhang was employed as a researcher at the National Library with Zhou Enlai's permission. Due to his political stance, Zhang was labeled as right-wing in 1957 during the Anti-Rightist Campaign. After Mao's death and the 3rd Plenary Session of the 11th Central Committee, he was rehabilitated. He died in 1986 at 93 years old.

See also
 Qu Qiubai
 History of the Chinese Communist Party

References

20th-century Chinese philosophers
1986 deaths
1893 births
Chinese activists
Chinese communists
Chinese political philosophers
People from Cangzhou
National University of Peking alumni
Academic staff of Peking University
Academic staff of Jinan University
Academic staff of Tsinghua University
Academic staff of Guangzhou University
Republic of China philosophers
People's Republic of China philosophers
Philosophers from Hebei
Educators from Hebei